LaWanda Page (born Alberta Peal; October 19, 1920September 14, 2002) was an American actress, comedian, and dancer whose career spanned six decades. Crowned "The Queen of Comedy" or "The Black Queen of Comedy", Page melded blue humor, signifyin', and observational comedy to jokes about sexuality, race relations, African-American culture, and religion. She released five solo albums, including the 1977 gold-selling Watch It, Sucker!. She also collaborated on two albums with comedy group Skillet, Leroy & Co. As an actress, Page is best known for portraying the Bible-toting and sharp-tongued "Aunt" Esther Anderson in the popular television sitcom Sanford and Son, which originally aired from 1972 until 1977. Page later reprised this role in the short-lived television shows Sanford Arms (1976–1977) and Sanford (1980–1981). She also co-starred in the 1979 short-lived series Detective School. Throughout her career, Page advocated for fair pay and equal opportunities for Black performers.

Early life
Page was born Alberta Peal on October 19, 1920, in Cleveland, Ohio. She was the older sister of Lynn Hamilton; however, this is not the Lynn Hamilton who co-starred with Page on Sanford and Son, despite a rumor that the two actresses were sisters. Series co-lead Demond Wilson, who played Lamont Sanford, said the rumor was false in 2016.

Page knew from a young age that she wanted to work in show business: as she told Call and Post journalist Mary Lynn in 1975, Page was "born talented" and "never took a singing or dancing lesson". Growing up, Page danced at the Friendly Inn Settlement in Cleveland, a community center run by the Women's Christian Temperance Union. When she was young, her family moved to St. Louis, Missouri. Page attended Banneker Elementary School, where she met Redd Foxx (who portrayed Fred Sanford on Sanford and Son), who was two years her junior. Eventually, both entered the field of comedy separately and performed their own stage acts, working alongside each other on the Chitlin' Circuit and Foxx's TV sitcom Sanford and Son.

Career

Dancing 
Page began her show business career at age 15 in St. Louis, where she learned how to fire dance. Swallowing fire, lighting matches and cigarettes with her fingertips, and walking over flames were part of Page's entertaining bag of tricks. She burned herself frequently in her early days, though never badly. But, as she told journalist Vashti McKenzie at the Baltimore Afro-American, "if I had to burn to make a living, I was willing to burn". Billed as "The Bronze Goddess of Fire" or "LaWanda, the Flame Goddess", Page entertained small St. Louis nightclubs. She later described one East St. Louis club where she worked as "the kind of place where if you ain’t home by nine o’clock at night you can be declared legally dead. [Everybody] walked around with knives in there. You better had one, too—knife or gun or something!" At some point, Page moved to Los Angeles, California. The exact year she moved is unknown, though she likely moved sometime in the 1950s. Once there, Page took a gig dancing and waiting tables at the Brass Rail Club for 15 years. She also toured her fire dancing act and made appearances at nightclubs across the country and world, including Canada, Brazil, and Japan.

Stand-up comedy 
It is unknown when and where Page began stand-up comedy. She may have been introduced to stand-up while dancing at the Brass Rail Club in Los Angeles. According to an interview in the Philadelphia Tribune, Page did not like comedy at first, but a fellow Brass Rail Club employee and member of the comedy duo Skillet & Leroy saw Page's potential, telling her: "you can do comedy. As a matter of fact, if you don’t do comedy you can’t work here". Page may have also been introduced to stand-up while touring the Chitlin' Circuit, where she shared stages with noted comedians such as Redd Foxx and Richard Pryor. No matter how or when she transitioned to comedy from dance, it was in Los Angeles that Page started honing the feisty approach to comedy that would make her famous. In the mid-1960s Page became a member of the comedy group Skillet, Leroy & Co. (before Page joined, the group was a duo known as Skillet & Leroy). Skillet was Ernest "Skillet" Mayhand (1916–2007) and Leroy was Wilbert LeRoy Daniel (1928–1993). During her tenure as a stand-up comic, a career she continued into the 1990s, Page often was billed as "The Queen of Comedy" or "The Black Queen of Comedy".

Page recorded five live solo comedy albums for the Laff Records label and several other collaborative live comedy albums with comedy group Skillet, Leroy & Co. in the late 1960s and early 1970s under her LaWanda Page stage name (she often went just by her first name, sometimes styled as La Wanda). Other than the relatively clean Sane Advice album, released two years after the run of Sanford and Son, Page's albums and stand-up material were raunchy blue comedy in nature. One release, a gold-selling album called Watch It, Sucker!, was titled after one of her Aunt Esther character's catchphrases in order to capitalize on her newfound television fame. Page used the catchphrase again for the title of her 1982 stand-up tour, "The Watch It Sucker Review". When the New Pittsburgh Courier wondered why "'Aunt Esther' might do a show like this", Page explained that she was not on tour because she needed the money; rather, she toured because she wanted to meet Aunt Esther's fans and perform her own stand up. In that, Page succeeded: the New Pittsburg Courier reviewed the show as "full of laughter and enjoyed by the large group who attended". Page also performed as herself after her Sanford and Son fame. On numerous occasions from 1976 to 1978, Page appeared as a stand-up comedian on Dean Martin Celebrity Roast, where she roasted celebrities like Frank Sinatra, Betty White, and Jimmy Stewart. In 1985, Page performed a raunchy set in the all-women stand-up special Women Tell the Dirtiest Jokes. Also included in the film were sets from Lois Bromfield, Marsha Warfield, Patty Rosborough, Jo Ann Dearing, Carole Montgomery, Judy Tenuta, and Barbara Scott.

Acting

Sanford and Son (1973-1977)
Page had been performing her comedy routine in nightclubs in St. Louis and Los Angeles for several years, but had planned to leave show business to move back to St. Louis to take care of her ailing mother. But a phone call from Redd Foxx in 1972 changed Page's mind. Earlier that year, the sitcom Sanford and Son, starring Foxx as Fred Sanford, had premiered on NBC. A man known for his generosity, Foxx brought his childhood friend Page to the attention of one of the show's producers, who was already familiar with Page and her act. Then, Foxx called Page to ask her to read for the role of Esther Anderson ("Aunt Esther"), the sister of Fred Sanford's late wife Elizabeth. At first, Page thought Foxx was playing a joke, and hung up—twice. But once Foxx convinced her that he was being serious, she auditioned and was offered the role. However, prior to taping, producers became concerned when Page, whose experience was limited primarily to nightclub stages, seemed to have difficulty working in a sitcom format. Eventually, one of the show's producers told Foxx that Page would need to be fired and that another actor would need to be cast before the show could begin taping. Foxx responded by insisting that Page keep the part, even threatening to walk away from the show if Page were fired. Besides Foxx's generosity, he knew Page would be a fantastic fit for the Aunt Esther role, saying that: "you never heard of the lady, but the night that first show of LaWanda's goes on the air, there'll be dancing in the streets in every ghetto in the United States". The producers relented and, after joining the series for the second season, Page's Aunt Esther went on to become one of the most popular TV sitcom characters of the 1970s. Atlanta Daily World celebrated Page's success as a "Cinderella story come true", and the Pittsburgh Post-Gazette described Page’s Aunt Esther as “a key ingredient” on Sanford and Son who “isn’t afraid of heathen Fred. She browbeats him at every turn in the tradition of God-fearing sisters who have seen the light and seek to quench the devil in a fun-loving man". Ron Miller at the Boston Globe listed Page as his eighth pick for his “Top Ten of TV’s lovable jerks” round-up.

Page's Aunt Esther was a combination of devout churchgoer and tough-as-nails realist, unafraid to state whatever was on her mind. While her relationship with Foxx's character, Fred Sanford, was usually confrontational, she portrayed a tender side when it came to her nephew Lamont Sanford (played by Demond Wilson). Common issues between brother-in-law and sister-in-law were Sanford's lack of business success and lukewarm religious faith. Sometimes, primarily because of their shared love for Lamont and the late Elizabeth, the two adversaries managed to find common ground. Although Sanford and Son was clearly Foxx's vehicle, Page's Aunt Esther could hold her own against the show's star. The church-going act of Esther was a highly praised contrast to the raunchy, expletive-filled material of Page's live act and records.

Sanford and Son ran for six seasons. After the sixth season, Foxx and his co-star Wilson left the show over unfair treatment and pay disputes with the network, leading to Sanford and Son’s cancellation in 1977.

Sanford Arms (1977) and Sanford (1981) 
Page continued her role as Aunt Esther on Sanford and Son spin-off Sanford Arms, which followed a new lead character, Phil Wheeler (Theodore Wilson). But without Foxx nor Demond Wilson, Sanford Arms received low ratings and was cancelled after four episodes. A review in Variety noted that Page “is a genuinely funny lady, but she looked considerably better when she had Foxx to work with and against. Restraint is not her stock in trade, and [Theodore] Wilson is an inadequate counterbalance”. In 1980 NBC ran another spin-off of Sanford and Son called Sanford, which ignored entirely the events of Sanford Arms. Foxx returned to play Fred Sanford, but Demond Wilson did not return to portray Lamont Sanford. Page joined the series in 1981 for its second season to reprise her role as Aunt Esther. However, Sanford was plagued with low viewership and ratings, and NBC ultimately cancelled the series mid-season in 1981.

Other film and television appearances
In 1977, Page appeared in an episode of The Love Boat titled "A Tasteful Affair; Oh, Dale!; The Main Event" alongside Sherman Hemsley. Page also appeared on several episodes of The Dean Martin Celebrity Roasts, and over the next two decades occasionally guest-starred in episodes of other popular television shows, including Amen, Martin, 227, Family Matters and Diff'rent Strokes. Page co-starred as Charlene Jenkins in the short-lived 1979 series Detective School. She appeared on Circus of the Stars as a fire eater. In the late 1990s and early 2000s, she appeared in a series of comical Church's Chicken television commercials featuring the catchphrase "Gotta love it!". She appeared on several tracks of the debut album by RuPaul titled Supermodel of the World released in 1993, most notably the hit song "Supermodel (You Better Work)". She also appeared in several music videos from the album. Among her movie credits are appearances in Zapped! (1982), Good-bye, Cruel World (1983), Mausoleum (1983), where in one scene the producers inserted the opening song to Sanford & Son to honor her legacy, the Steve Martin film My Blue Heaven (1990), as an extremely foul-mouthed clown in Bobcat Goldthwait's 1991 comedy Shakes the Clown, CB4 (1993), a cameo appearance in the 1995 movie Friday, stealing the opening scene with a one-liner, Don't Be a Menace to South Central While Drinking Your Juice in the Hood (1996), and a recurring role as Ms. Porter during the first season of the 1990s television sitcom, Martin.

Comedic style 
Page used blue comedy, observational humor, character comedy, and physical comedy to share vignettes about sexuality and religion that drew howling laughter from her audiences. She was one of the few women who performed extended spoken word pieces in the black signifying or toasting tradition. Scholar L. H. Stallings argues that through blue comedy, a genre often associated with men, Page and other Black female comics in the genre “continue a Black female trickster tradition dedicated to creating oral cultures, divergent language practices, and initiatives to change definitions and boundaries of gender and sexuality in society”. In addition, Stallings writes that by speaking openly about her own sexual desires and pleasure, Page broke taboos and challenged dominant ideologies of Black women’s performances of gender and sexuality. Page’s delivery and cadence was based in Black folklore traditions, working-class vocabulary and speech patterns, and Black church sermons. The Black church, argues scholar J. Finley, at times uplifted women’s voices less than men’s, so Page “dealt with women's silence in the church by transforming the sermon into a radical secular form via BWCL [Black women’s comic literacy] and blues idioms". Page infused jokes like “Whores in Church” from Watch It, Sucker! with lilting and rhythmic gospel vocals that, when coupled with her salacious humor, played with divisions between the sacred, secular, and lewd. Page employed slight impressions to distinguish the characters in her stories, but primarily relayed her tales as an omniscient narrator. She riffed off her audience, riling them up as she escalated her jokes. She also used physical comedy. At one rowdy 1989 performance in Richmond, Virginia, Page removed her underwear while on stage and auctioned it off to the highest bidder in the increasingly rambunctious crowd.

Personal life
Page was married and widowed three times. She married her first husband at the age of 14, and before he died when she was 19 they had a daughter, Clara. After her third husband died when Page was in her thirties, she decided to never remarry. Page was religious and affiliated with the Landmark Community Church during her first years in Los Angeles. In 1981, she became an evangelist in the Holiness Church. Her daughter, Clara, was an evangelist preacher.

Death 
Page died of a heart attack following complications from diabetes on September 14, 2002, at age 81. She is interred in an outdoor crypt at Inglewood Park Cemetery in Inglewood, California. Page's daughter, the evangelist Clara Estella Roberta Johnson, died on June 4, 2006, in Los Angeles, California, at the age of 69.

Legacy 
Page followed in the footsteps of comic Moms Mabley along with carving her own path, making room for generations of future comics. Comedian and actress Thea Vidale called Page “a trailblazer who was never given the respect she deserved". Not only was Page a trailblazer, but she also continued to offer advice and support to those she met along the way. Actress Myra J. recalls that Page was “the nicest woman; gave me great advice”, and Tony Spires noted that Page “was underrated. A warm woman, nice and endearing with a lot of history from back in the day. Very cool and down to earth". Director Donald Welch summed Page’s life as: “LaWanda lived the life she loved, and loved the life she lived".

Discography
Mutha Is Half a Word (1971)
The Goodly Soul (1971; with Skillet & Leroy)
Back Door Daddy (1972; with Skillet & Leroy)
Preach On Sister, Preach On! (1973)
Pipe Layin' Dan (1973)
Watch It, Sucker! (1977)
Sane Advice (1979)

References

External links 

1920 births
2002 deaths
African-American female comedians
Burials at Inglewood Park Cemetery
Deaths from diabetes
Actresses from St. Louis
Actresses from Cleveland
American women comedians
American television actresses
African-American actresses
American film actresses
Comedians from Missouri
20th-century American comedians
20th-century American actresses
20th-century African-American women
20th-century African-American people
21st-century African-American people
21st-century African-American women
Comedians from Ohio